Glasgow North West is a constituency of the House of Commons of the Parliament of the United Kingdom (Westminster). It was first used at the 2005 general election.

Boundaries

The Glasgow City wards of Anniesland, Blairdardie, Drumry, Hayburn, Jordanhill, Knightswood Park, Knightswood South, Scotstoun, Summerhill, Victoria Park, and Yoker.

Glasgow North West is one of seven constituencies covering the Glasgow City council area. All are entirely within the city area.

Prior to the 2005 general election, the city area was covered by ten constituencies, of which two straddled boundaries with other council areas. The area of the North West constituency was covered by most of the Glasgow Anniesland constituency and part of the Glasgow Kelvin constituency.

Constituency profile
Glasgow North West lies on the north bank of the River Clyde. It is a seat of contrasts, taking in affluent areas of Glasgow, such as Jordanhill and Scotstoun, as well as more deprived areas, such as the Drumchapel housing estate. The constituency was formerly a safe seat for the Labour Party.

Members of Parliament

Election results

Elections in the 2010s

Elections in the 2000s

See also 
 Politics of Glasgow

References

♯ This reference gives all recent Glasgow City Westminster election results. You select the year and then the constituency to view the result.

Westminster Parliamentary constituencies in Scotland
Constituencies of the Parliament of the United Kingdom established in 2005
Politics of Glasgow
Partick
Drumchapel